Siemens ME45 is a GSM-900/1800 cell phone, designed for enhanced durability. It weighs 99 g, and contains monochrome screen, supports WAP and GPRS. It includes electronics identical to Siemens S45 phone, and it can be flashed with software from Siemens S45i (adds email client).

It was introduced in 2001.

The main advantage of ME45 is its resistance to dust, shock and water.

Siemens ME45 is used by Jason Bourne in The Bourne Supremacy film.

ME45
Mobile phones introduced in 2001
Mobile phones with infrared transmitter